Farnaz Ghazizadeh (born 3 December 1974) is an Iranian journalist, and BBC Persian Television presenter. She has been involved with BBC Persian Television. In 1999, she married Sina Motalebi.

References

The information in this article is based on that in its Persian equivalent.
 BBC Persian TV – services

1974 births
Iranian journalists
British people of Iranian descent
People from Tehran
Living people
BBC newsreaders and journalists